Jodina rhombifolia (the quebracho flojo (the loose quebracho), quebracho flajo, sombra de toro or quebrachillo) is a tree species in the family Santalaceae.

References

External links
 Sombra de toro image on flickr

Santalaceae